The U.S. unincorporated territory of the United States Virgin Islands first required its residents to register their motor vehicles and display license plates in 1917.

Passenger baseplates

1917 to 1967
The U.S. Virgin Islands also adopted these standards in 1956, having issued plates 6 inches in height by 12 inches in width (with non-standard mounting holes) since 1952.

1968 to present

References

External links
 Plateshack.com - Virgin Islands Y2K

+Virgin Islands
United States Virgin Islands-related lists
Transportation in the United States Virgin Islands